Patrik Kühnen (born 11 February 1966) is a German former professional tennis player, who turned professional in 1985.

Kühnen had his biggest career singles win in the fourth round at Wimbledon in 1988 when he beat Jimmy Connors en route to the quarterfinals in which he lost to eventual champion Stefan Edberg. The right-hander reached his highest singles ATP-ranking on May 15, 1989, when he became the number 43 of the world. He won three doubles titles during his career. He was part of the German Davis Cup teams that won the competition in 1988 and 1993. Since 2003 he is the captain for Germany's Davis Cup team and also coaches the German team in the World Team Cup which won the competition in 2005 and 2011.

ATP career finals

Singles: 2 (2 runner-ups)

Doubles: 6 (3 titles, 3 runner-ups)

ATP Challenger and ITF Futures finals

Doubles: 3 (1–2)

Performance timelines

Singles

Doubles

External links
 
 
 

1966 births
Living people
German male tennis players
Hopman Cup competitors
People from Püttlingen
West German male tennis players
German tennis coaches